The International Meridian Conference was a conference held in October 1884 in Washington, D.C., in the United States, to determine a prime meridian for international use.  The conference was held at the request of U.S. President Chester A. Arthur. The subject to discuss was the choice of "a meridian to be employed as a common zero of longitude and standard of time reckoning throughout the world". It resulted in the recommendation of the Greenwich Meridian as the international standard for zero degrees longitude.

Background
By the 1870s there was pressure both to establish a prime meridian for worldwide navigation purposes and to unify local times for railway timetables. The first International Geographical Congress, held in Antwerp in 1871, passed a motion in favour of the use of the Greenwich Meridian for (smaller scale) passage charts, suggesting that it should become mandatory within 15years.

In Britain, the Great Western Railway had standardised time by 1840 and in 1847 the Railway Clearing Union decreed that "GMT be adopted at all stations as soon as the General Post Office permitted it". The Post Office was by this time transmitting time signals from Greenwich by telegraph to most parts of the country to set the clocks. By January1848, Bradshaw's railway guide showed the unified times and met with general approval, although legal disputes meant that it was not until 1890 that GMT was formally established across the UK.

In the United States, the problems were much more severe, with one table showing over 100 local times varying by more than 3hours. In 1870, Charles F. Dowd published a pamphlet titled A System of national time and its application advocating three time zones across the country based on the Washington meridian, modifying this to four zones based on the Greenwich meridian in 1872.

The first proposal for a consistent treatment of time worldwide was a memoir entitled "Terrestrial Time" by Sandford Fleming, at the time the chief engineer of the Canadian Pacific Railway, presented to the Canadian Institute in 1876. This envisaged clocks showing 24-hour universal time with an extra dial having a local time rounded to the nearest hour. He also pointed out that many of the corrections for local mean time were greater than those involved in abandoning solar time. In 1878/79, he produced modified proposals using the Greenwich meridian. Fleming's two papers were considered so important that in June 1879 the British Government forwarded copies to eighteen foreign countries and to various scientific bodies in England. At the same time the American Metrological Society produced a "Report on Standard Time" by Cleveland Abbe, chief of the United States Weather Service proposing essentially the same scheme.

These proposals did not meet universal approval in the scientific community, being opposed by John Rodgers, Superintendent of the Naval Observatory, Washington and British Astronomer Royal, George Airy  who had both established wire services supporting local time in various cities. The Naval Observatory had also foiled the onward transmission of the Greenwich time signal from Harvard, where it was received via transatlantic cable and used to time a time ball in Boston.

The International Meridian Conference had its origins in the Third International Geographical Congress held in Venice in 1881, in which the establishment of a universal prime meridian and a uniform standard of time was high on the agenda. The Seventh International Geodesic Conference in Rome in October1883 then thrashed out most of the technical details, leaving the diplomatic agreements to a later conference. The United States passed an Act of Congress on  authorizing the President to call an international conference to fix on a common prime meridian for time and longitude throughout the world.

On 11 October 1883, a convention of railroad executives met in Chicago and agreed to the implementation of five time zones in North America, using as a basis Greenwich Mean Time. Thus, a strong sense of fait accompli preceded the Washington conference, although setting local times was not part of the remit of the conference and it was not legally established until 1918.

Participants 
Twenty-six countries, represented by 41 delegates, participated in the conference:

 
 
 
 
 
  (absent)
 
 
 
 
 
 
 
 
 
 
 
 
 
 
 
 
 
 , included delegates from

Resolutions 

On 22 October 1884, the following resolutions were adopted by the conference (voting took place on 13 October):

Resolution 2, fixing the meridian at Greenwich, was passed 22–1 (San Domingo, now the Dominican Republic, voted against); France and Brazil abstained. The French did not adopt the Greenwich meridian as the beginning of the universal day until 1911. Even then it refused to use the name "Greenwich", instead using the term "Paris mean time, retarded by 9minutes and 21seconds". France finally replaced this phrase with "Coordinated Universal Time" (UTC) in 1978. 

Resolution 4 expressly exempts standard time from the universal day. Although two delegates, including Sandford Fleming, proposed the adoption of standard time by all nations, other delegates objected, stating that it was outside the purview of the conference, so neither proposal was subjected to a vote. Thus the conference did not adopt any time zones, contrary to popular belief.

Regarding resolution 6: Great Britain had already shifted the beginning of the nautical day from noon, twelve hours before midnight, to midnight in 1805, during the Battle of Trafalgar. The astronomical day was shifted from noon, twelve hours after midnight, to midnight effective  by a resolution of the newly formed International Astronomical Union.

On 13 October 1884, the following resolution was not adopted:

Twenty-one countries voted against the proposal, while three (France, Brazil, San Domingo) voted in favor.

Delegates 
From the Act of the Conference the Delegates were:

Outcomes

The main issue at the conference, apart from procedural issues such as the provision of an authorized French translation of the proceedings, was France's insistence that the meridian should have a strictly neutral character in the same way that they maintained that the metre was a neutral measure. This requirement conflicted with the need to base measurements on an established observatory on land and Fleming's proposal of using the anti-meridian of Greenwich was not supported by the British delegation. In the end, the pragmatic argument for continuity with most nautical charts won the day and the French delegation abstained in the vote.

On the question of universal time, Fleming's opinion to one of the lead-up committees was borne out: "In my judgment, the nearest approach to it which may be attempted with any chance of success, is to have first, a primary standard time, based on the prime meridian that is to be used for non-local purposes; second, to have twenty-four secondary standard times to govern local reckoning." There was discussion of setting zones as small as 10minutes (2½°) (that's 10minutes of time, not 10minutes of arc/angular measure), but no motion was tabled, as there was little experience to guide the choice.

Most European countries aligned their clocks with Greenwich within ten years, Sweden and North America already having done so, and the trend continued. The French maintained Paris time till 1911 and the following year convened a second conference to address the differences between different observatories which had become apparent, leading to the establishment of the Bureau International de l'Heure after World War I.

References

Bibliography

External links 

 Proceedings of the 1884 International Meridian Conference - notes with links to scanned page images at Steve Allen's site
 
 
 Proceedings of the 1884 International Meridian Conference
 

Diplomatic conferences in the United States
Geography conferences
19th-century diplomatic conferences
1884 in the United States
1884 in international relations
1884 in Washington, D.C.
1884 conferences
Meridians (geography)
October 1884 events